The Last of Chéri is a novel written by Colette. It was published in Paris in 1926. It is the sequel to Colette's 1920 novel Chéri.

Plot summary
The Last of Chéri  picks up the lives of Cheri and Lea after a six-year break during which World War I has been fought and Cheri returns an uninjured hero. During this time, Edmee and Madame Peloux have become more assertive in home and business as do many women in the burgeoning suffragist movement. Cheri finds himself wandering aimlessly with no focus now that he does not have his former lover Lea nor the war to occupy his time.

Cheri is also perplexed by the assertive behaviors of Edmee and his mother;  he cannot adapt to the new role of women in the post-War era. Eventually, Cheri and Edmee grow further apart and live separate lives, Edmee taking lovers without any jealousy from her husband. Attempting to recapture his past, Cheri visits old friends but finds that they, too, have moved on to new ventures and do not want to dwell in stories of the past. Cheri grows increasingly impatient with his life surrounded by Edmee and Madame Peloux and finds any route he can to escape even for a little while; including buying a car and taking friends on long day trips into the French countryside.

Because he can find no purpose to his life, Cheri obsesses about Lea.  He makes the mistake of visiting her one day to find that she has aged and is overweight with short gray hair. Cheri is repulsed by Lea's appearance and plunges into an even deeper despair. Just when Cheri has reached the point where he can think of nothing that interests him or motivates him to think beyond the present, he runs into an old acquaintance, the Pal, who offers up her flat to Cheri's need for time alone.

In the Pal's flat, Cheri finds a wall filled with photographs of Lea, and he spends countless nights lying on a divan and staring at the images. Cheri makes one last attempt to connect with Edmee by asking if she would like a child but Edmee is aghast at the proposition, and Cheri realizes that their marriage is truly over. Cheri visits his mother who understands her son's anguish but can do nothing to assuage it, and they part with Cheri amazed to see a tear in his mother's eye. Cheri visits the Pal's apartment again and with images of Lea staring down at him raises a revolver to his head and pulls the trigger.

1926 French novels
Novels by Colette
Sequel novels
French romance novels